Keskese  ge'ez ግእዝ (ከስከሰ) sebea ሰበአ (𐩫𐩪𐩫𐩪) is an archaeological site in Eritrea. Dating from around 500 BCE, it is renowned for its old stelae. Some of the edifices at the site are inscribed in Ge'ez, and are up to 14 metres in height. Keskese was excavated by Daniel Habtemichael in the early 2000s (decade).

See also
Adulis
Matara
Nakfa
Qohaito
Sembel

References

Archaeological sites in Eritrea
Geography of Eritrea
Former populated places in Eritrea